Netru Indru Naalai may refer to:
 Netru Indru Naalai (1974 film), a 1974 film
 Netru Indru Naalai (2008 film), a 2008 film
 Netru, Indru, Naalai (musical), musical stage show by Mani Ratnam

See also 
 Indru Netru Naalai, a 2016 film